The tawny antpitta (Grallaria quitensis) is a species of bird in the family Grallariidae.

It is found in Colombia, Ecuador, and Peru.

Its natural habitat is subtropical or tropical moist montane forest.

References

tawny antpitta
Birds of the Colombian Andes
Birds of the Ecuadorian Andes
Birds of the Peruvian Andes
tawny antpitta
Taxonomy articles created by Polbot